Alfredo de los Santos (born 12 February 1956) is a Uruguayan footballer. He played in nine matches for the Uruguay national football team from 1975 to 1983. He was also part of Uruguay's squad for the 1975 Copa América tournament.

References

External links
 

1956 births
Living people
Uruguayan footballers
Uruguay international footballers
Association football defenders
Club Nacional de Football players
Club Atlético River Plate footballers
Defensor Sporting players
Barcelona S.C. footballers
C.F. Cobras de Querétaro players
Uruguayan expatriate footballers
Expatriate footballers in Argentina
Expatriate footballers in Ecuador
Expatriate footballers in Mexico